Eysenck is a surname. Notable people with the surname include:

Hans Eysenck (1916–1997), psychology professor
Eysenck Personality Questionnaire, psychological test developed by Hans Eysenck
Michael Eysenck (born 1944), psychology professor, son of Hans
Sybil B. G. Eysenck, psychologist, wife of Hans